Lake George or Lake Katunguru is a lake in Uganda. Like the other lakes in the region, it was renamed after a member of the British royal family, in this case Prince George, later to become King George V. Lake George drains to the southwest into Lake Edward through the Kazinga Channel.

The area surrounding the lake is populated by the Batooro, Basongora, Banyampaka and Banyankore peoples, among others. All these nations speak closely-related dialects which are generally referred as Runyakitara language. Akatunguru is a word which means ‘onion’ and is used by all these different peoples. Thus, the lake came to be known as Katunguru because of its onion-like shape.

The explorer Henry Morton Stanley was the first European to see the lake in 1875, after following the course of the Katonga River from Lake Victoria during his trans-African expedition. Thinking it was part of Lake Albert, he renamed it Beatrice Gulf. Exploration plans were aborted because of the threat of conflict with the kingdom of Bunyoro. On his second visit to the area, in 1888 during the Emin Pasha Relief Expedition, Stanley discovered Lake Edward, and realizing that there were two independent lakes, he gave Lake George its current name.

References

 
George
Katonga River
Ramsar sites in Uganda